Yanamala Rama Krishnudu is a senior politician from Andhra Pradesh.

He served as the Speaker of the Andhra Pradesh Legislative Assembly from 1995 to 1999. He is often regarded as an intellectual statesman and a technically sound leader.

He served as the Minister for Finance & Planning, Commercial Taxes, Legislative Affairs in Nara Chandrababu Naidu Government from June 2014 to May 2019.

References 

|-

1951 births
Living people
Speakers of the Andhra Pradesh Legislative Assembly
Third N. Chandrababu Naidu Cabinet (2014–2019)
State cabinet ministers of Andhra Pradesh
Telugu Desam Party politicians
Members of the Andhra Pradesh Legislative Council
Leaders of the Opposition in the Andhra Pradesh Legislative Council
People from East Godavari district
Telugu politicians